The  is a dam in Hichisō, Gifu Prefecture, Japan, completed in 1926.

References 

Dams in Gifu Prefecture
Dams completed in 1926

ja:上麻生ダム